Thonbanhla is the fifth of nats in the official Burmese pantheon of nats. She was a native of a Mon village called Takunnwan. She was (sic) "beautiful in three ways within one day." She was given to King Duttabaung of Pyay, but the queen was jealous of her beauty and told the king that she was actually very ugly and so fat that she could not fit through the city gate. Hearing this, the king refused to marry Thonbanhla who then died in despair. Another story says that she was the younger sister of Maung Tint De. She married King Smim Htaw Yama of Utthala and gave birth to a daughter, Shin Mi-hnè, but then died of a sudden illness. She is portrayed standing on an ogre bending over a dais supported by an elephant. She wears a topknot, her right hand on her chest and her left hand by her side.

References

05
Burmese goddesses